ABC Radio Adelaide (call sign: 5AN) is the ABC Local Radio station for Adelaide.  It is broadcast at 891 kHz on the AM band. It is also available on Digital TV in Adelaide.

History
5AN started transmitting on 15 October 1937 with equipment located in the central telephone exchange, and a radio mast located in Post Office Place.  The station transmitter moved to Brooklyn Park, already the site of 5CL's transmitter, on 4 May 1944.

The radio mast was moved from the east side of the building to the south side in 1952 to make way for a road to the projected new airport. The proximity of the transmitter site to the airport was inconvenient for both operations, so a new transmitter site was built in open fields at Pimpala, at the corner of Sherriffs and Hillier Roads, Reynella, and was opened on 20 September 1961 by the Postmaster-General C W Davidson.

New transmitters for 5AN and 5CL, rated at 50 kW, manufactured by STC, had been installed in the building by the Postmaster-General's Department. The final stage of each transmitter contained three parallel 3J/261E air cooled triodes running in class C at 90% efficiency. These were driven by a class B modulator with the same type of valves. The outputs of the two transmitters were fed by separate transmission lines to the coupling hut at the base of the guyed mast antenna, which accepted and radiated both signals.

The ABC radio studios, previously in a converted church and stables on Hindmarsh Square, and "Football House", on the opposite side of the square, were in 1974 relocated to an eight-storey building in Collinswood, for many years the home of the ABC television studios.  

In 2000 the "5AN" branding was replaced with "891 ABC Adelaide".
In the 1980s the radio manager was David Hill.

Name change controversy
In December 2016, the ABC was legally prevented from changing the name of 891 ABC Adelaide to ABC Radio Adelaide after local community station Radio Adelaide successfully applied for a court injunction.

Radio Adelaide chairman Iain Evans said the station had pursued legal action to stop the ABC "hijacking" their station's name and accused the ABC of being "breathtakingly arrogant".  However, the ABC's local content manager Graeme Bennett said the name change wasn't about taking the community station's name or their audience and said it made sense for the ABC to drop the frequencies from the names of their stations given the rise in popularity of digital radio in Australia.

In allowing the injunction, Justice Natalie Charlesworth said that while the logos and branding were quite different, there was the potential for confusion to arise when the station names were heard on air. As a result, the ABC station was briefly named ABC Adelaide.  This prevented the station from being part of a national rebrand when metropolitan ABC stations dropped their respective frequencies from their names at the start of 2017, in favour of simply being called "ABC Radio" followed by the name of the respective cities which saw stations like 612 ABC Brisbane become ABC Radio Brisbane.

The two stations reached an out-of-court agreement in March 2017, allowing the ABC to finally name the station ABC Radio Adelaide, bringing it in line with other capital city stations which had already dropped their frequencies from their names. Radio Adelaide decided to settle after considering the risk of losing the case and the associated costs they would have had to pay along with a potential rebranding, while the ABC said they were pleased to reach a commercial resolution before the issue was required to proceed to trial.

Local Announcers (Weekdays)
 Overnights with Trevor Chappell (Monday-Thursday) & Rodd Quinn (Friday) - 2:00am–6:00am (National broadcast)
 Breakfast with Stacey Lee & Nikolai Beilharz - 6:00am–7:45am
 ABC News - 7:45am–8:00am
 AM with Sabra Lane - 8:00am–8:30am (National broadcast)
 Breakfast with Stacey Lee & Nikolai Beilharz - 8:30am–9:00am
 Mornings with David Bevan - 9:00am–11:00am
 Conversations with Richard Fidler - 11:00am–12:00pm (National broadcast)
 The World Today with Eleanor Hall (Monday-Thursday & Rachel Mealey (Friday) - 12:00pm–12:30pm (National broadcast)
 Afternoons with Sonya Feldhoff - 1:00pm–3:30pm
 Chewing the Fat and Shooting the Breeze with Sonya Feldhoff and Julian Schiller - 3:30pm-4:00pm
 Drive with Julian Schiller (Monday-Friday) - 4:00pm–6:30pm
 PM with Linda Mottram - 6:30pm–7:00pm (National broadcast)
 Evenings with Peter Goers (Monday-Thursday) & Christine Anu (Fridays, National Broadcast) - 7:00pm–10:00pm
 Nightlife with Philip Clark & Indira Naidoo - 10:00pm–2:00am (National broadcast)

All ABC Local Radio stations in South Australia, as well as 999 ABC Broken Hill (which is located in New South Wales, but is on Central Time) simulcast 891 programs when not airing local programming.

See also
John Kenneally, music director, producer, breakfast and evening radio presenter, 1984–2010

References

External links
 ABC Radio Adelaide
 ABC Radio Adelaide Program Schedule

Radio stations in Adelaide
Radio stations established in 1937